Alles außer Sex (Sex & More) is a German comedy drama television series which aired on the TV station ProSieben between 2005 and 2006. The German television premiered on 9 November 2005 with an audience of 2.9 million viewers. Thematically, it is similar to the American television series Sex and the City and the British series Coupling.

See also
List of German television series

External links
 

German comedy-drama television series
2005 German television series debuts
2006 German television series endings
ProSieben original programming
German-language television shows